Eduardo Andres Villegas Camarena (born 29 March 1964) is a Bolivian football manager and former player who played as a defender.

Club career
Villegas began his career at hometown club Petrolero. In 1986, Villegas joined The Strongest, staying with the club for two seasons. In 1988, Villegas joined Blooming, before re-signing for The Strongest in time for the 1989 Bolivian Primera División, where he won the title with The Strongest. In 1991, Villegas signed for Wilstermann, winning the Copa Bolivia in his solitarity season at the club. In 1994, after a third spell with The Strongest and San José, Villegas signed for Bolívar, winning the Primera División. In 1995, Villegas re-joined San José, winning another Primera División. In 1997, Villegas joined The Strongest for a fourth spell, before signing for Independiente Petrolero in 1998, where he retired.

International career
From 1985 to 1989, Villegas represented Bolivia 16 times, including at the 1987 and 1989 editions of the Copa América.

Managerial career
During the 2005 Liga de Fútbol Profesional Boliviano, Villegas managed former club The Strongest, leading the club to a second placed finish. In 2006, Villegas joined Universitario de Sucre as manager, before re-joining The Strongest a year later. In 2009, Villegas became Bolivia manager, serving in the role until November 2010. Following his spell with Bolivia, Villegas managed Wilstermann and Wilstermann, before once again re-joining The Strongest in March 2012. In 2014, Villegas was appointed manager of Oriente Petrolero, joining Bolívar a year later. In 2016, Villegas managed Sport Boys. In 2017, Villegas joined Oriente Petrolero, before joining San José in 2018. In January 2019, Villegas was appointed manager of Bolivia for a second time. He was fired after the 2019 Copa América where his team finished bottom.

Personal life
Villegas' younger brother Óscar was also a footballer, and is also a manager. Both played together at San José in 1994 and later worked together for three years.

Managerial Statistics

References

1964 births
Living people
Sportspeople from Cochabamba
Bolivian footballers
The Strongest players
Club Blooming players
C.D. Jorge Wilstermann players
Club San José players
Club Bolívar players
Bolivia national football team managers
Bolivian football managers
The Strongest managers
Universitario de Sucre managers
C.D. Jorge Wilstermann managers
Oriente Petrolero managers
Club Bolívar managers
Club Blooming managers
Club San José managers
Sport Boys Warnes managers
Club Always Ready managers
2019 Copa América managers
Association football defenders
Bolivia international footballers